Dyadobacter psychrophilus  is a Gram-negative, aerobic and psychrophilic bacterium from the genus of Dyadobacter which has been from soil which was contaminated with hydrocarbon in Bozen in Italy.

References

External links
Type strain of Dyadobacter psychrophilus at BacDive -  the Bacterial Diversity Metadatabase	

Cytophagia
Bacteria described in 2010
Psychrophiles